Karen Floyd is an American attorney and politician from the state of South Carolina. She is a former prosecutor and low level magistrate judge and later served as the only female Chairperson of County Council for the state's fourth largest county. Karen was elected Chairperson of the South Carolina Republican Party and served from 2009 to 2011. As the first woman Chairperson of the state party, under her tenure, the party experienced historic wins by adding a Republican congressional seat and winning all constitutional offices, the first time in the state's history. Additionally, Republicans Nikki Haley and Tim Scott were also both elected as governor and congressman, respectively, while Floyd served as state party chairwoman.

Floyd is the founder of multiple businesses and the publisher of Elysian, a women's magazine with international circulation.

Political life
Karen Floyd was the first woman to serve as the chair of the Spartanburg County Council, and currently serves on the South Carolina Ports Authority Board. In 2006 Floyd was the Republican nominee for Superintendent of Education. She was defeated by Jim Rex by only 455 votes, the closest margin of victory in a statewide election in South Carolina's history. She served as chairman of the South Carolina Republican Party from May 2009 to May 2011. She did not seek re-election as Chairman.

Personal life
Karen lives in Spartanburg, South Carolina with her husband Gordon and two children.

Employment
1999 to Present 
Palladian Group, Chief Executive Officer

In 1999, Floyd founded The Palladian Group, which serves marketing, technology, and development needs of clients worldwide. Floyd oversees six divisions and over 30 employees.

2015 to Present      
ELYSIAN Magazine, Publisher

In 2015, Floyd founded Palladian Publications and began serving as the publisher of ELYSIAN Magazine.

Education
1986	University of South Carolina School of Law
President, Student Bar Association; Daniel McLeod Scholarship Award
1983	Goucher College; Bachelor of Arts
Chairperson, Academic Honor Board; Elizabeth King Elliott Fellowship Award

Affiliations
Spartanburg County, SC, and American Bar Association, 1986 to present
American Judiciary Society, 1990 to present
Spartanburg Area Chamber of Commerce, Board Member 1998 to 2002; Board of Governors 2005 to present
South Carolina Ports Authority, Board Member 2007 to 2012
Piedmont Area Girl Scouts, Board Member/Nominating Committee to 2008
Human Resources Management Association, 1994 to 2000
Arts Partnership, Board Member 1998 to 2006
Susan B. Komen Upstate Race for the Cure, Founding Board Member 1998, Secretary 1999 to 2001
Spartanburg Development Council, Board of Directors, 1998 to 2002
Share the Vision, Board Member 1998 to 2002 Co-Chairman 1999 to 2002
YMCA, Executive Board 1999 to 2002
Palmetto Conservation Foundation, Board of Directors 2000 to 2002
United Way Campaign, Board Member 2001 to 2003
Department of Natural Resources, Board Member 2004 to 2006
Board Representative prior to 1998
Spartanburg County Higher Education Commission, Member
National Council Chain Restaurants, Board of Trustees
Governor's Leadership Forum
Spartanburg County Little Theater, Board of Trustees
Spartanburg County Children's Shelter
SAFE Homes Network
Department of Mental Health, Board Advisor
Children's Coalition Against Sexual Abuse, Board Member
DSS Treatment Team, Board Member
International Franchise Association, Board Member

Notable achievements

Mrs. Floyd has achieved many awards throughout her career, including:
Order of the Palmetto (South Carolina's highest award)
Business and Professional Women Club, Woman of the Year
Spartanburg Technical College, Woman of the Year/Politics
Career Woman of the Year
Outstanding Young Woman of the Year
Toast of the Town, Salvation Army

See also
Politics of South Carolina

References

External links

South Carolina Republicans
State political party chairs of South Carolina
Women in South Carolina politics
Politicians from Spartanburg, South Carolina